KPRL (1230 AM) is a radio station broadcasting a News/Talk format. Licensed to Paso Robles, California, United States. The station broadcasts local as well as nationally syndicated talk shows such as Jerry Doyle, Bill Wattenburg, Rush Limbaugh, and Laura Ingraham. The station is currently owned by North County Communications, LLC.

References

External links
FCC History Cards for KPRL
 KPRL Website
 Local News

PRL